Times Are Changing is an album by trumpeter Freddie Hubbard released on the Blue Note Records label. It features performances by Hubbard, drummer Michael Shrieve, percussionist Munyungo Jackson, keyboardist Bayete, with guest appearances by bassist Stanley Clarke, drummer Stix Hooper and singer Phil Perry.

Track listing
 "Spanish Rose" (Todd Cochran) - 6:27  
 "Back to Lovin' Again" (Todd Cochran)  4:30  
 "Was She Really There?" (G.F. M'lely) - 5:55  
 "Corazon Amplio (A Song for Bert)" (Todd Cochran) - 5:09  
 "Times 'R Changin'" (Todd Cochran) - 5:29  
 "Sabrosa" (Tex Allen) - 8:40  
 "Fragile" (Sting) - 6:27

Personnel
Freddie Hubbard - trumpet, flugelhorn
Michael Shrieve - cymbals, drum programming 
Munyungo Jackson - percussion 
Todd Cochran - keyboards, drum programming 
Stanley Clarke - electric bass (track 1) 
Stix Hooper - drums (tracks 1 & 5)  
Phil Perry - vocals (track 3)

References

1989 albums
Freddie Hubbard albums
Blue Note Records albums